This article is about the particular significance of the year 1996 to Wales and its people.

Incumbents
Secretary of State for Wales – William Hague
Archbishop of Wales – Alwyn Rice Jones, Bishop of St Asaph
Archdruid of the National Eisteddfod of Wales
John Gwilym Jones (outgoing)
Dafydd Rowlands (incoming)

Events
1 January - Michael German is awarded the OBE for his public and political service.
15 February - The Sea Empress, an oil tanker, runs aground off Milford Haven, causing devastation to the west Wales coastline.
1 April - The Local Government (Wales) Act 1994 comes into force, creating 22 unitary authorities.
3 April - The first EuroHowl is held in Aberystwyth, Wales.
29 June - The Prince's Trust concert in Hyde Park, London is attended by 150,000 people.
18 July - Howard Hughes is sentenced to life imprisonment at Chester Crown Court for the rape and murder of 7-year-old Sophie Hook at Llandudno 12 months previously. The trial judge recommends that Hughes, 31, should never be released.
28 August - The Prince and Princess of Wales, are formally divorced at the High Court of Justice in London, the first time in history that a Prince of Wales has successfully gone through a divorce. By negotiation, Her Royal Highness The Princess of Wales is restyled, Diana, Princess of Wales.
November - The Owain Glyndŵr Society is founded.
date unknown
The Church in Wales ordains its first women priests.
South Wales Constabulary changes its name to South Wales Police.

Arts and literature
Sir Anthony Hopkins opens the Cliff Tucker Theatre at the University of Wales, Lampeter.
Alice Thomas Ellis is dismissed as a columnist on the Catholic Herald newspaper because of her attack on the reputation of the late Archbishop Derek Worlock.
Steve Balsamo stars in a West End revival of Jesus Christ Superstar.

Awards
Glyndŵr Award - Jan Morris
National Eisteddfod of Wales (held in Ffairfach, near Llandeilo)
National Eisteddfod of Wales: Chair - R. O. Williams
National Eisteddfod of Wales: Crown - David John Pritchard
National Eisteddfod of Wales: Prose Medal - withheld
Wales Book of the Year:
English language: Nigel Jenkins, Gwalia in Khasia
Welsh language:
Gwobr Goffa Daniel Owen - Eirug Wyn, Smoc Gron Bach

New books
Ron Berry - This Bygone
Ruth Bidgood - The Fluent Moment
Gillian Clarke - The Whispering Room
Keith Kissack - The Lordship, Parish and Borough of Monmouth
Howard Marks - Mr Nice
Kenneth Morris - The Dragon Path
Tim Rishton -

Film
Prince Valiant filmed at Gwrych Castle.

Welsh-language films

Music
John Cale - Walking on Locusts
Peter Maxwell Davies - The Doctor of Myddfai (opera)
Gillian Elisa - Rhywbeth yn y Glas.
Karl Jenkins - Diamond Music
Donna Lewis - Now in a Minute
Super Furry Animals - Fuzzy Logic.

Broadcasting
The Broadcasting Act 1996 changes the funding formula for S4C.

Welsh-language television
Heno (Welsh-language news programme, broadcast until 2001 and returned in 2012).

English-language television
Barry Welsh is Coming
In the Blood, presented by Steve Jones

Sport

BBC Wales Sports Personality of the Year – Ryan Giggs
Football
The Welsh Football Trust is founded.
Llansantffraid F.C. win the Welsh Cup and are offered sponsorship by Total Network Solutions.
Snooker
Mark Williams wins the Welsh Open tournament in Cardiff.

Births
25 February - Laura Halford, rhythmic gymnast
25 April - Kizzy Crawford, Bajan-Welsh folk-pop crossover singer-songwriter
17 May - Seb Davies, rugby player
25 July - Jarrod Evans, rugby player
1 August - Gemma Evans, footballer
14 September - Shaun Evans, rugby player
2 October - Keston Davies, footballer
28 November - Owen Evans, footballer

Deaths
16 January - Dai Ward, footballer, 61
7 March - Aled Eames, historian, 74
11 March - Sir Granville Beynon, physicist, 81
14 March - Dewi Bebb, Wales rugby union player, 57
16 March - Harry Peacock, Wales rugby union player, 87
14 April - Mervyn Levy, artist and critic, 81
7 May - Taffy Williams, soldier, 62
27 July - Billy Rees, footballer, 72
29 August - Dillwyn Thomas, cricketer, 91
5 September - Clem Thomas, rugby player, 67
24 September - I. E. S. Edwards, Egyptologist, 87
26 October - Huw Owen, theologian and academic, 69
10 November - Dafydd Orwig, politician and academic, 68
9 December
Diana Morgan, playwright and screenwriter, 86
Ivor Roberts-Jones, sculptor, 83
29 December - Pennar Davies, poet and theologian, 85
date unknown 
Thomas Nathaniel Davies, artist and teacher
Thomas David Frank Evans, WWII prisoner-of-war
Harry Hanford, footballer, 88
Thyrza Anne Leyshon, painter, 103

See also
1996 in Northern Ireland

References

Wales